Henry Seig Myles (September 1, 1904 – November 30, 1978) was an American professional football player who spent two seasons in the National Football League with the Buffalo Bisons in 1929 and the Newark Tornadoes in 1930.

References

1904 births
1978 deaths
Players of American football from West Virginia
Newark Tornadoes players
Buffalo Bisons (NFL) players
People from Lewisburg, West Virginia